Attila Horváth (28 July 1967 – 13 November 2020) was a discus thrower from Hungary.

Biography
He represented his native country at two consecutive Summer Olympics (1992 and 1996). His personal best was 68.58 metres, thrown on 24 June 1994 in Budapest. He was a nine-time national champion in the men's discus event, including eight in a row (1990–1997).

Horváth was born in Kőszeg and died in Szombathely, of complications from COVID-19 on 13 November 2020, at age 53.

Achievements

Awards
 Hungarian athlete of the Year (1): 1994

References

Sources
IAAF Profile

1967 births
2020 deaths
Hungarian male discus throwers
Athletes (track and field) at the 1992 Summer Olympics
Athletes (track and field) at the 1996 Summer Olympics
Olympic athletes of Hungary
World Athletics Championships medalists
Goodwill Games medalists in athletics
Sportspeople from Szombathely
Deaths from the COVID-19 pandemic in Hungary
People from Kőszeg
Competitors at the 1994 Goodwill Games
20th-century Hungarian people